Vahdat Qom Football Club is an Iranian football team based in Qom, Iran and currently plays in the 2nd Division.

Players

First-team squad

Season-by-Season

The table below shows the achievements of the club in various competitions.

See also
 2014–15 Iran Football's 2nd Division

References

Football clubs in Iran
Association football clubs established in 2014
2014 establishments in Iran